Madakasira is a town with a population 19,432 in 2001 and also a mandal in Sri Satya Sai district in the state of Andhra Pradesh in India. It is located near the state border with Karnataka. The Madakasira Hill Fort in the town is a centrally protected monument of national importance.

History 

According to a mythological tradition mentioned in the medieval kaifiyat (bureaucratic record), the site of the village was once a hermitage of the sage Mandavya. Rama installed a shivalinga, called Rameshvara, on the local hill after defeating Ravana. A Chola king later built a Shiva temple and tank to the south-west of the present-day town centre, to atone for his sin of killing a Brahmin. A village called Mandavya-palle developed around the temple. It came to be known as Madakasira, because the majority of the inhabitants were potters who manufactured madakas (earthen pots).

In the 17th century, the area was under the suzerainty of the Vijayanagara Empire and the Bijapur Sultanate. The members of the family that established present-day Madakasira, near the former village of Madakapalle, were apparently chiefs of Sira. After defeating Vijayanagara and capturing Sira, the Bijapur rulers granted Madakapalle and the nearby Ratnagiri to these chiefs. The rulers of Bijapur revoked and restored the grant several times.

In the 18th century, the Madakasira Fort was held by multiple powers, including the Maratha noble Murari Rao, Hyder Ali and Tipu Sultan of Mysore, and the Nizam of Hyderabad. In 1800, the Nizam surrendered the fort to the British.

In various historical records, the name of the village appears as "Marke Sira", "Merg Sera", "Marcassira", and "Madaksira".

Geography 
It has an average elevation of 676 metres (2221 ft). The height of the Madakasira hill is 2936 feet from the Sea Level.Formerly Madakasira is called as SIMHAGIRI because hill from one side looks like a sleeping lion. Around Madakasira there are numerous isolated Peaks and  Rocky  Clusters which are devoid of any vegetation. Madakasira town is cooler compared to the climate of elsewhere in Sri Sathya Sai District, hence aptly known as Ooty of Sri Sathya Sai District.

There are more than 20 villages in the Madakasira Mandal, they are Halukur, Amidalagondi, Eguva Ramagiri, Maruvapalli, E Achampalli, Kothalam, Chandakacherela, Gowdanahalli, R Anantapuram, Chatram, Mallinayakkanahalli, Cheepuleti, Madakasira, Melavoi, Govindapuram, Jadrahalli, Karesankanahalli, Yerrabommanahalli, Upperlahalli, Haresamudram, Bullasamudram, Manur, Kallumarri, C Kodigapalle and Thirumaladevarahalli. Mandals in this Assembly region are Madakasira, Amarapuram, Rolla, Gudibanda and Agali.

Historical places 

Besides the Madakasira Fort, there are many historical places in and around Madakasira, including Shiva temples and inscriptions. The hill on which the fort is located has a temple built during the Vijayanagara rule. The town has recently constructed a large Shirdi Sai Baba Temple.

Education 
The medium of education is Telugu, Kannada and English,
Acharya N. G. Ranga Agricultural University's College of Agricultural Engineering is there in Madakasira town Near Tulasidaama vruddasramam Village, Penukonda Road.

Demographics 
Majority of the Madakasira population belongs to Kunchitiga community of Gowdas which is more than 60% of the total population.
There are 120 Yadav dominated villages in the Madakasira assembly constituency.

Indian census, 2001, the demographic details of Madakasira mandal is as follows:
 Total Population: 	73,222	in 15,413 Households.
 Male Population: 	37,344	and Female Population: 	35,878
 Children Under 6-years of age: 9,709	(Boys -	4,972 and Girls – 4,739)
 Total Literates: 	34,125

References 

Cities and towns in Sri Sathya Sai district
Archaeological sites in Andhra Pradesh
Mandal headquarters in Sri Sathya Sai district